"Pow Pow" is the first single from American rock band LCD Soundsystem's third album This Is Happening, released on April 17, 2010 to coincide with the 2010 Record Store Day.  It was initially released with only 1000 copies of a one-sided vinyl record.  The song has been described as similar to LCD Soundsystem's debut single Losing My Edge.

Music video
In November 2010, a music video was released for the track. The video was directed by David Ayer and starred Academy Award-nominated actress Anna Kendrick as a "shape-shifter" who collects "the souls of wicked men".

Personell
James Murphy – guitar, simmons, omnichord, vocoder, vocals, claps, congas, cowbell, synare
Pat Mahoney – drums
Tyler Pope – bass
Nancy Whang – vocals
Jayson Green – vocals

Track listing
A. Pow Pow - 8:15

References

LCD Soundsystem songs
2010 singles
Record Store Day releases
Songs written by James Murphy (electronic musician)
2010 songs